Colegio Weber School was a Chilean high school located in Rancagua, Cachapoal Province, Chile. It was closed in 2012, after the Ministry of Education revoked the official recognizement of the educational institution.

References 

Educational institutions with year of establishment missing
Secondary schools in Chile
Schools in Cachapoal Province
Educational institutions disestablished in 2012
Defunct schools in Chile
2012 disestablishments in Chile